U.S. Bank Center may refer to:

 U.S. Bank Center (Milwaukee), a skyscraper in downtown Milwaukee, Wisconsin, the tallest building in the state of Wisconsin, and the tallest building between Chicago and Minneapolis
 U.S. Bank Center (Phoenix), a highrise in Phoenix, Arizona
 U.S. Bank Centre, in Seattle, Washington

See also
U.S. Bank Building (disambiguation)
U.S. Bank Plaza (disambiguation)
U.S. Bank Tower (disambiguation)